Hālah bint Wuhayb ibn ʿAbd Manāf ibn Zuhrah, was one of Abd al-Muttalib's wives.

Biography
Al-Waqidi reported that Halah married Abd al-Muttalib the same day as her cousin Aminah bint Wahb ibn Abd Manaf ibn Zuhrah, the mother of the Islamic prophet Muhammad, married Abdullah ibn Abd al-Muttalib. However the veracity of this is claim is highly dubious as it was never reported in any other contemporary biographies of Muhammad by other early muslims historians.

She was the mother of Hamza, Safiyya, al-Muqawwim and Ḥajl. Thus Hamza was related to Muhammad in several ways. He was a second cousin (on his mother's side); an uncle (on his father's side); and foster-brother by Thuwaybah, the freed slave girl of Abu Lahab. Hamza and Muhammad were also brothers-in-law, as Hamza's wife Salma bint Umays was a half-sister of Maymuna, a wife of Muhammad. Another sister, Umm Fadl, was married to Abbas ibn Abd al-Muttalib, another uncle of Muhammad.

Halah's brothers include Malik (father of Sa'd ibn Abi Waqqas) and Nawfal.

Family tree

 * indicates that the marriage order is disputed
 Note that direct lineage is marked in bold.

See also
Halah (name)
Wahb
Family tree of Muhammad

References

External links
http://homepages.rootsweb.com/~cousin/html/p354.htm#i21678

6th-century women
6th-century Arabs
Women companions of the Prophet
Family of Muhammad
Sahabah ancestors
Banu Zuhrah